Windsor Road is a notable road in the Hills District of Sydney. It starts from Windsor, New South Wales and ends at Northmead, New South Wales. However, Windsor Road is not continuous. The northern section of Windsor Road (Windsor to Kellyville) is continuous with Old Windsor Road instead, designated route A2. The southern section of Windsor Road forms a T-junction with route A2 at Kellyville.

The North West T-way runs next to and parallel to Windsor Road from Kellyville to Rouse Hill.

History

Windsor to Kellyville
This section of Windsor Road was part of the original Windsor Road, which opened in 1794. When the new Windsor Road opened in 1812, the original Windsor Road is aligned such that this section and the new section is continuous, leaving the southern original section renamed to Old Windsor Road and forms a T-junction with Windsor Road. This remained until 2002 when the Old Windsor Road regained importance and the junction was remade to the original Windsor Road alignment.

Kellyville to Northmead
This newer section of Windsor Road was completed in 1812. Metroad 2 used to run along Windsor Road between Windsor and Showground while State Route 40 used to run along the entire stretch of Windsor Road from Northmead to Windsor. The opening of the M2 Hills Motorway forced Metroad 2 to realign to Old Windsor Road and Metroad 2 was decommissioned on this section of the road. In 2007, State Route 40 was realigned to Old Windsor Road and the northern section of Windsor Road. As a result, this section has had no route allocation since then.

Road classification
The passing of the Main Roads Act of 1924 through the Parliament of New South Wales provided for the declaration of Main Roads, roads partially funded by the State government through the Main Roads Board (later the Department of Main Roads, and eventually Transport for NSW). Main Road No. 184 was declared along this road on 8 August 1928, from the intersection with Pennant Hills Road just north of Parramatta to Windsor (and continuing westwards via Richmond, Bilpin and Bell to the intersection with Great Western Highway at Mount Victoria).

Former route allocations
Windsor Road has had few but continually-changing former route allocations. Where and when the former route numbers were implemented are stated below.

Windsor – Kellyville:
 State Route 40 
 Metroad 2 
 A2 
Kellyville – Castle Hill:
 State Route 40 
 Metroad 2 
unallocated: 
Castle Hill – Northmead:
 State Route 40 
unallocated:

See also

 Old Windsor Road

References

Streets in Sydney
Historical roads of New South Wales
The Hills Shire